The News is an album by drummer Andrew Cyrille. It was recorded in August 2019 at Sound on Sound Studios in New Jersey, and was released by ECM Records in 2021. On the album, Cyrille is joined by guitarist Bill Frisell, David Virelles on synthesizer and piano, and Ben Street on bass. The musicians on the album are identical to those on Cyrille's 2016 album The Declaration of Musical Independence with the exception of Virelles, a last-minute replacement for Richard Teitelbaum, who was suffering from health problems at the time of the recording session, and who died in 2020.

Three of the pieces on the album ("Mountain", "Go Happy Lucky", and "Baby") were written by Frisell, while Virelles contributed "Incienso" and shared credit with Cyrille on "Dance of the Nuances". "Leaving East of Java" was composed by AACM member Adegoke Steve Colson, and was previously heard on the 2000 Trio 3 album Encounter, featuring Cyrille, Oliver Lake, and Reggie Workman. Cyrille's "With You in Mind" was previously recorded for the 2006 album Low Blue Flame with Cyrille and Greg Osby, as well as the 2014 album Us Free: Fish Stories, which features Cyrille, Henry Grimes, and Bill McHenry. The title track, also by Cyrille, previously appeared on his 1978 album The Loop, and features unique sounds produced by a snare drum covered with a newspaper and played with brushes, with the other musicians responding.

Reception

In a review for DownBeat, Ed Enright stated that the album "further cements [Cyrille's] legacy as a premier force in jazz improvisation over a span of some six decades," and commented: "You... feel the group's warm, wide-open, all-enveloping instrumental sound, and the music comes across as deliberate and free, never rushed." Mike Hobart, writing for the Financial Times, awarded the album 4 stars, and remarked: "Cyrille continues to adapt his polyrhythmic grasp of time, space and pulse to the demands of free jazz and structured composition alike."

In an article for AllMusic, Thom Jurek wrote: "The News is a master class in the less-is-more approach to drumming as well as ensemble play. Brilliant." Writing for The Guardian, John Fordham commented: "Cyrille has learned all about jazz's rich complexities – and then sought to distil them into ever simpler essentials in projects of his own... Cyrille's hidden-hand presence is glimpsed in taps, ticks and quietly crisp cymbal grooves, hushed snare rolls and offbeat accents – and the whisper of brushes on a newspaper spread over the drumheads on the title track... Quiet, this News may be – but it's right up there among ECM Records' entrancing understatements."

Ian Patterson, in an article for All About Jazz, called the album "a quietly seductive offering of real charm and deceptive depth," and wrote: "Cyrille is the dynamo that drives this quartet with his less-is-more vocabulary. His embrace of space, his nuanced choices of texture, tone and weight of pulse draw only the essential from Frisell, Street and Virelles. Not one note or sound from this most intuitive of quartets seems excessive." In a review for JazzTimes, Jackson Sinnenberg remarked: "Although they may at times evoke chaos, Cyrille and his group cohere better than ever. The News is a true quartet record, one that allows each musician's sound, compositional style, and sense of the world to shine through."

Writing for Jazz Journal, Andy Hamilton referred to the album as "a very fine release," and commented: "The pianist and guitarist understand how to keep out of each other’s way, though to describe the album as a series of trio episodes, as one writer does, is an exaggeration. Frisell and Virelles offer a sympathetic lyricism that floats over the drummer’s often lightly enunciated but always beautiful time." Jon Turney of London Jazz News noted: "Cyrille plays with a kind of uninhibited restraint. His constantly shifting, needle sharp backdrop imparts a feeling he could do anything at any time, but what he chooses is always perfectly judged," and called the album "a quietly brilliant set... Late work from an old master, and a record to pass to any drummers you may come across who could do with learning that less is more."

At Jazzwise, Kevin Le Gendre wrote: "Andrew Cyrille may be seen first and foremost as an avant-garde legend whose career has many historic moments... yet he is also a master storyteller beyond genre definitions. Cyrille's often painterly textural invention has always been outstanding, and here he shows a consummate command of low tempo on daringly spacious, sparse material where he chooses every strike of snare or crash of ride cymbal with the utmost care, as if the notes were punctuation in a letter or exclamation marks in an intimate conversation." Nick Lea, in a review for Jazz Views, stated that the album "demonstrates a continuing quest in the creation and developing of musical relationships," and commented that, in relation to The Declaration of Musical Independence, on The News "the quartet find new ways of working together, building on what has been learned and past experiences. The resulting music works in a far less abstract manner than the earlier set, more tightly focussed and with a lyricism that flows throughout."

The News was included in 2021 end-of-year "Best Jazz Albums" lists at PopMatters, Treble Zine, and Glide Magazine.

Track listing

 "Mountain" (Frisell) - 8:25
 "Leaving East of Java" (Adegoke Steve Colson) - 8:49
 "Go Happy Lucky" (Frisell) - 5:21
 "The News" (Cyrille) - 5:34
 "Incienso" (Virelles) - 5:35
 "Baby" (Frisell) - 5:34
 "Dance of the Nuances" (Cyrille, Virelles) - 7:24
 "With You in Mind" (Cyrille) - 7:11

Personnel 
 Andrew Cyrille – drums, percussion
 Bill Frisell – guitar
 David Virelles - synthesizer, piano
 Ben Street - bass

Production
 Sun Chung – producer
 Rick Kwan – recording engineer

References

2021 albums
Andrew Cyrille albums
ECM Records albums